Der kleine Kuno is an East German film, directed by Kurt Jung-Alsen. It was released in 1959.

External links
 

1959 films
East German films
1950s German-language films
German children's films
1950s German films